The Orto Botanico dell'Università di Pavia also known as the Orto Botanico di Pavia (Botanical Garden of Pavia in English), is a botanical garden maintained by the University of Pavia. It is located at Via S. Epifanio, 14, Pavia, Italy, and is open to the public on weekends.
The  botanical garden covers an area of about two hectares and has approximately two thousand different species of plants, which are organised in sections. The current director is Francesco Sartori.The Botanical Garden stands in the place where the church of Saint Epiphanius was located, of which it preserves the cloister of the 15th century.

The garden was started in 1773 as a successor to Pavia's earlier Orto dei Semplici (established 1558). By 1775 the garden was in use, with its first wooden greenhouses constructed in 1776 designed by Giuseppe Piermarini, then modified by Luigi Canonica in 1815. Nocca Domenico organized and expanded the garden 1797–1826, adding collections to exchange seeds and plants, and building a masonry greenhouse to replace the earlier wooden structures. The garden was extensively damaged in World War II, after which its greenhouses were relocated to the main building's south side.

Today the garden contains about 2000 taxa, with major collections of aquatic plants, conifers, hosta, hydrangea, magnolia, medical plants, peat bog plants, and a rose garden. Its four greenhouses are as follows:

Caespitosa, Obregonia denegrii, and Welwitschia mirabilis, and many species of Frailea, Lobivia, and Rebutia, as well as 30 species of Lithops.
 Orchidaceae greenhouse — orchids from Central America and North America, plus ferns, Araceae, Bromeliaceae, and Tillandsia.
 Temperate greenhouse — plants of economic importance, fruit, etc.
 Tropical greenhouse (built 1974) — Araceae, Arecaceae, Euphorbiaceae, Liliaceae, Marantaceae, and Pteridofitas.

Chronology
1520- Probably it is the openings year of a collection about officially plants that is calls “Orto dei semplici” (“ Garden  of remedies”) near the Leonardo Leggi’s residence, reader of “Ordinary Practice Medical”. This collection changed location more times over the years.
1773- Fulgenzio Witman, became reader in 1763, and was able to transfer the Garden to the place where it is now. The new site was set like a model from the earlier garden of Padova.
1776- During Valentino Brusati’s direction, greenhouses were built, by the architect Giuseppe Piermarini.
1777-1778- Giovanni Antonio Scopoli became director and gives to the Botanical Garden a structure similar to the current one. This fact can be checked by a publication that is in one of the most important Scolopi’s work, Deliciae Florae et Faunae Insubricae, in 1786. Besides, under the direction of Scolopi were established a lot of connections with European Botanicals.
1797-1826-  Domenico Nocca became director and started again a lot of works of organization for the Garden: he ordered to Luigi Canonica to restructure the Scolopi’s greenhouse and enriched the collection with exchange of seeds and plants.
1871- Under the direction of Santo Garovaglio a Laboratory Crittogamico was started, to study plant diseases caused by parasites.
1883-1919- The Garden was directed by Giovanni Briosi: he instituted the first hot greenhouses.
1943- The director Raffaele Ciferri, took away some part of the greenhouse because of war; but then he edified the side monumental of the institute and the rose’s garden that still today it is a great feature of the Garden.
1964-1982- Ruggiero Tomaselli was the director; he increased the collection by importations of original plants from their origin places, where he did some searches; was edified the first tropical greenhouse in 1974.
1997- The Botanical Vegetable Pot was part of the Department of Ecology of Territory and Environment. In the same year Alberto Balduzzi became director and made a new collection of medicinal plants.
2005- The Seed Bank of the University of Pavia was set up to preserve seeds of native plants that are threatened from the Lombardy region.

See also 
 List of botanical gardens in Italy

References 

 Orto Botanico dell'Università di Pavia
 Horti entry (Italian)
 Georg Kohlmaier, Barna von Sartory, Houses of Glass: A Nineteenth-Century Building Type, MIT Press, 1986, page 362. .
 A. Pirola, "Orto Botanico di Pavia: dal sistema linneano alle collezioni tematiche", Convegno di studio Le reti locali degli Orti Botanici: il caso della Lombardia, Bergamo, 3 – October 2002.
 G. Pollaci, "L’Orto Botanico di Pavia dalla fondazione al 1942", Ticinum, 6: 20–23, 1959.

External links
Botanical Garden
 Museum System of the University of Pavia

Botanical gardens in Italy
Buildings and structures in Pavia
1773 establishments in Italy
University of Pavia
Gardens in Lombardy
Pavia